The municipalities of the Dominican Republic are, after the regions and the provinces, the third level of the political and administrative division of the Dominican Republic.

The division of provinces into municipalities (municipios) is established in the Constitution and further regulated by Law 5220 on the Territorial Division of the Dominican Republic. It was enacted in 1959 and has been frequently amended to create new provinces, municipalities and lower-level administrative units.

Municipalities may be further divided into secciones (literally: sections) and parajes (literally: places or neighborhoods). Municipal districts (distritos municipales) may be formed in the case of municipalities with several urban centres.

The provinces as the second level of political and administrative division contain at least two municipalities. The Distrito Nacional, which is neither a municipality nor a province, consists of only one municipality, Santo Domingo (Constitution: "the city of Santo Domingo de Guzmán is the Distrito Nacional").

Administration
According to the Constitution and the law, the municipalities are administered by the municipality's Municipal Office (ayuntamiento), which is a legal entity in its own right consisting of two bodies: the alcadía (Mayor's Office), with the alcalde (Mayor), and the Municipal Council (concejo de regidores), with at least five members (regidores). The Municipal Council is an exclusively normative, regulatory and supervisory body, the Mayor's Office the executive one. The mayor is a voting member of the Municipal Council. He and his deputy, as well as the regidores and their deputies, are elected by the electorate on the occasion of elections held nationally every four years.

If a municipality consists of more than one urban center, the additional centres may be elevated to the status of municipal district (distrito municipal), with the remaining district of the municipality called cabecera (main municipality). The administration of the municipal district is the responsibility of a municipal district office (junta municipal), which includes the director (director) and a municipal district council (junta de vocales) with at least three members (vocales). The director and his deputy, as well as the vocales and their deputies, are elected by the electorate on the occasion of elections held nationally every four years. They represent the municipal district to the municipality and are subordinate to it.

If a municipality is further divided into secciones, the municipal council appoints an alcalde pedáneo for each of them. He reports to the mayor or, if his sección is in a municipal district, to its director. If the municipality is further divided into parajes, the municipal council appoints an ayudante del alcalde pedáneo for each of them.

Municipalities are often given special designations because of their number of inhabitants: ciudad (city) in the case of urban centers with over 10,000 inhabitants or the capital of a province, villas (town) in the case of towns with over 1,000 inhabitants or seats of a local government, poblados (village) in the case of villages.

Municipalities 
The following is a list of the 158 municipalities (municipios) of the Dominican Republic as of June 1, 2021.

Provincial maps with their municipalities

Bibliography
 Constitución de la República Dominicana. June 13, 2015. World Intellectual Property Organization (WIPO).
 Ley Nº 176-07 del Distrito Nacional y los Municipios. Congreso Nacional, July 20, 2007.

See also
 List of cities in the Dominican Republic

References

External links
  Federación Dominicana de Municipios (FEDOMU), Dominican federation of municipalities
  Oficina Nacional de Estadística (ONE), Statistics Portal of the Dominican Republic

 
Dominican Republic
Subdivisions of the Dominican Republic
Dominican Republic 2
Municipalities, Dominican Republic
Municipalities